Homoeosoma privata is a species of snout moth in the genus Homoeosoma. It was described by Francis Walker in 1875 and is known from St. Helena.

References

Moths described in 1875
Phycitini